Proposition 30 is a California ballot proposition that appeared in the general election on November 8, 2022. The measure was defeated. The initiative would have raised taxes on the wealthy to fund wildfire management and electric vehicle (and ZEV) incentives and infrastructure.

A "yes" vote supported the tax increase on income above $2 million; a "no" vote supported maintaining the current tax rate for people of this income.

Proposal 

The initiative would raise taxes by 1.75% on annual personal income in excess of $2 million and direct 45% of the revenue to incentives, 35% to charging stations, and 20% to wildfire prevention. The tax revenue is estimated to be between $3 and $4.5 billion annually. The tax will sunset in 2043, or after California achieves a reduction in greenhouse gas (GHG) emissions of 80% below 1990 levels, whichever is earlier. 

Wildfires and gas combustion contribute to air pollution and release greenhouse gases, so these measures could improve air quality and contribute to climate mitigation. It would combat wildfires by increasing the budget for the California Department of Forestry and Fire Protection by up to $1 billion annually.

Support and opposition 
The campaign for Proposition 30 has mostly been funded by the rideshare company Lyft, which could use the incentives to facilitate compliance with the state's electric vehicle requirements. Specifically, ride-hailing companies will be required by the state to log 90 percent of their miles in electric vehicles by 2030, and the proposition could increase the number of drivers with electric vehicles. By April 2022, Lyft had already spent $8 million in support of the proposition. It has also been supported by the California Democratic Party, California Environmental Voters, the State Building and Construction Trades Council of California, and the California State Association of Electrical Workers. It is supported by Representatives Ro Khanna and Barbara Lee, and mayors Sam Liccardo and Libby Schaaf. Environmental and transportation experts argue that Proposition 30 is necessary because the state's prior  investments in electrification are insufficient. 

The proposition has been opposed by the California Republican Party, the California Teachers Association, the California Chamber of Commerce, and the Howard Jarvis Taxpayers Association. Governor Gavin Newsom also criticized Lyft, saying that the proposition is "a cynical scheme devised by a single corporation to funnel state income tax revenue to their company", noting that the state has already committed $10 billion for electric vehicles and their infrastructure. The campaign against Proposition 30 also produced a TV ad featuring Newsom, arguing that the initiative "is a trojan horse that puts corporate welfare above the fiscal welfare of our entire state". The biggest donors to the opposition campaign are hedge fund manager William S. Fisher and billionaire Michael Moritz, and investment firm founder Mark Heising.

Environmental policy experts such as Bill Magavern of the Coalition for Clean Air have refuted the governor's claims, clarifying that nothing in the measure directs money specifically to Lyft. “It doesn’t take money from any other purpose. This is money that otherwise would just be in the pockets of really rich people,” he said. “And I think when you’re talking about motives, you got to look who’s funding the governor’s attack: really rich people.” For this reason, Joe Garofoli of the San Francisco Chronicle alleges that Newsom opposes the measure to further his presidential ambitions. The measure's failure was widely attributed to Newsom's opposition.

Polling

Notes

References 

Climate change adaptation
Emissions reduction
Electric vehicles in California
Wildfires in California
2022 California ballot propositions